The 1920 Nebraska Cornhuskers football team represented the University of Nebraska in the 1920 college football season. The team was coached by second-year head coach Henry Schulte and played its home games at Nebraska Field in Lincoln, Nebraska. The team competed as an independent. Schulte departed shortly after the end of the season, though he remained at the school to coach track until 1939.

Schedule

Coaching staff

Roster

Game summaries

Washburn

Sources:

Nebraska rested many key players in its season-opening shutout of Washburn, the final meeting between the teams.

Colorado Agricultural

Sources:

Nebraska edged out Colorado Agricultural (now Colorado State University) in the first meeting between the teams.

Notre Dame

Nebraska took a lead into the second quarter but did not score again. Notre Dame and head coach Knute Rockne controlled time of possession in the second half through a series of low-risk, lengthy drives. The Irish pulled ahead to win largely due to the efforts of George Gipp, who rushed for 218 yards despite Notre Dame netting only 174 yards.

South Dakota

Sources:

Rutgers

Nebraska dominated Rutgers in what was NU's farthest-ever trip east. This was the only meeting between the schools until Rutgers joined the Big Ten in 2014.

at Penn State

at Kansas

Sources:

NU led 20–0 at halftime, but Kansas responded with twenty unanswered points in the second half and the game ended in a draw.

MAC

Sources:

Washington State

Sources:

Nebraska blew a twenty-point halftime lead for the second time in 1920, losing to Washington State 21–20. This was the first meeting between Nebraska and Washington State.

References

Nebraska
Nebraska Cornhuskers football seasons
Nebraska Cornhuskers football